James Grady Brown (born 11 May 1952) is a Scottish former professional footballer, who played as a goalkeeper. During his career, he made over 300 appearances in the Football League and spent four years in the North American Soccer League playing for the Detroit Express, Washington Diplomats and Chicago Sting. He also gained one cap for Scotland in 1975.

Early life
As a teenager, Brown attended St. Ambrose High School in Lanarkshire.

Club career
Brown began his career at Albion Rovers, appearing over 100 times for the club after making his debut at the age of 16. In 1972, he played in a pre-season friendly against Chesterfield and impressed the club's management. Several months later, in December 1972, he joined the club, turning down a move to Brighton & Hove Albion. He quickly established himself in the first-team and attracted the attention of First Division side Sheffield United, joining the Blades on the final day of the transfer window in the 1973–74 season. He went on to spend five years at Bramall Lane, winning the club's player of the year award in 1975, before moving to the North American Soccer League with Detroit Express in 1979.

He returned to Britain in 1982, spending a brief time at Cardiff City before joining Kettering Town as cover for the injured Steve Conroy. He made his league debut for the Poppies in 3–2 defeat to Frickley Athletic and made 18 appearances during the 1982–83 season. At the start of the following season, he rejoined Chesterfield as the club began suffering a financial crisis. He competed with Chris Marples for the starting spot for several years before Marples departure to Stockport County in 1987. Several years after officially retiring Brown was named as a substitute on two occasions in his forties, the 1995 Football League Third Division play-off Final and the first round of the FA Cup in 1997, at the age of 45.

International career
Having represented Scotland at under-23, Brown was called up for several matches in the British Home Championship as understudy to Stewart Kennedy. When Kennedy suffered an ankle injury during a defeat to England and was unable to recover for the following match against Romania at Stadionul Național in Bucharest during qualifying for UEFA Euro 1976, handing Brown his first cap. The match, played in front of 80,000 fans, ended in a 1–1 draw.

Later life
Since 1986, he has been the commercial manager at Chesterfield. During his time in the role, Brown, along with three other members of staff, began keeping records of the club's financial activity under chairman Darren Brown after becoming concerned about his business practices. He later testified in front of a Football League panel against the then chairman and the records were eventually used to help convict Darren Brown of fraud in 2005, being sentenced to four years in prison.

Brown later stated "we knew the proper way to run the club. In the very first week, Darren Brown was paying money out with no invoices, so we began to keep a log.[...] We had to stand up in front of Darren Brown and tell the truth, which we did to get Brown out and save the club". He also helped the club in a number of other capacities, including running the club lottery and writing the match programmes.

References

Living people
1952 births
Footballers from Coatbridge
Scottish footballers
Scotland international footballers
Association football goalkeepers
Albion Rovers F.C. players
Chesterfield F.C. players
Sheffield United F.C. players
Detroit Express players
Washington Diplomats (NASL) players
Chicago Sting (NASL) players
Cardiff City F.C. players
Kettering Town F.C. players
Expatriate soccer players in the United States
Scottish expatriate footballers
North American Soccer League (1968–1984) players
North American Soccer League (1968–1984) indoor players
English Football League players
Scottish Football League players
Scotland under-23 international footballers
Scottish expatriate sportspeople in the United States